Cameron Joseph Tringale (born August 24, 1987) is an American professional golfer. Born in Mission Viejo, California, Tringale was a three-time NCAA All-American at Georgia Tech. He was a member of the PGA Tour from 2010 until 2022, when he resigned his membership and joined LIV Golf.

Amateur career 
After graduating from Mission Viejo High School in 2005, Tringale attended Georgia Tech and won the Atlantic Coast Conference championship as a freshman. He played in the 2007 U.S. Amateur Championship, where he lost his first round match. He qualified again in 2009 and reached the third round. Tringale was a three-time NCAA All-American, earning second-team honors in 2006 and 2007, and making the first team in 2009 as a senior. He qualified for the 2009 U.S. Open but missed the cut, and he represented the U.S. that year as a member of the Palmer Cup and Walker Cup teams.

Professional career 
In December 2009, Tringale successfully gained a 2010 PGA Tour card through qualifying school, finishing T19. He made his debut as a member of the PGA Tour at the 2010 Sony Open in Hawaii in January. In 21 starts that season, Tringale made just more than $300,000, leaving him 176th on the money list. His best finishes were ties for 11th at the Viking Classic and the Justin Timberlake Shriners Hospitals for Children Open.

In December, Tringale regained his PGA Tour card for 2011 by finishing fourth at Q-School. That season he collected fourth-place finishes at the Greenbrier Classic and CIMB Classic and a fifth at the Texas Open.

He finished fourth at the 2012 Farmers Insurance Open, seventh at the Zurich Classic of New Orleans and eighth at the Shell Houston Open. His best result in 2013 was third at the Tampa Bay Championship.

In the 2014 PGA Tour season, Tringale finished fourth at the Houston Open and Greenbrier Classic. Six days after the 2014 PGA Championship, Tringale disqualified himself after he realized he signed an incorrect scorecard. He originally finished T33. During the playoffs, he tied for second at The Barclays.

Tringale was runner-up at the 2015 Zurich Classic of New Orleans.

In August 2022, Tringale announced that he had resigned from the PGA Tour and joined LIV Golf; he held the record for the highest career earnings on the tour without a tournament victory.

Personal life
Tringale is married to Tasha Tringale. Tringale is a Christian. Tringale sponsors a child through Compassion International. He has also made other donations to the charity from his golf winnings.

Professional wins (1)

Other wins (1)

Results in major championships
Results not in chronological order in 2020.

CUT = missed the half-way cut
DQ = Disqualified
"T" = tied
NT = No tournament due to COVID-19 pandemic

Summary

Most consecutive cuts made – 4 (2021 Open Championship – 2022 Open Championship, current)
Longest streak of top-10s – 0

Results in The Players Championship

CUT = missed the halfway cut
"T" indicates a tie for a place
C = Canceled after the first round due to the COVID-19 pandemic

Results in World Golf Championships

1Cancelled due to COVID-19 pandemic

"T" = Tied
NT = No tournament
Note that the Championship and Invitational were discontinued from 2022.

U.S. national team appearances
Amateur
Palmer Cup: 2009
Walker Cup:  2009 (winners)

See also
2009 PGA Tour Qualifying School graduates
2010 PGA Tour Qualifying School graduates
2017 Web.com Tour Finals graduates
2018 Web.com Tour Finals graduates

References

External links 

American male golfers
Georgia Tech Yellow Jackets men's golfers
PGA Tour golfers
LIV Golf players
Korn Ferry Tour graduates
Golfers from California
Sportspeople from Mission Viejo, California
People from Laguna Niguel, California
1987 births
Living people